The Commissioner's Trophy is a trophy presented each year by the Commissioner of Baseball to  Major League Baseball’s (MLB) World Series champion. Recent trophy designs contain flags representing each team in North America's top two leagues, the National League and the American League. The two participating teams in that year's World Series were previously represented by two press pins set on the base of the trophy. It is the only championship trophy of the major professional sports leagues in the United States and Canada in North America that is not named after a particular person (contrasting with the National Hockey League's Stanley Cup, Major League Soccer's Philip F. Anschutz Trophy, the National Basketball Association's Larry O'Brien Championship Trophy, and the National Football League's Vince Lombardi Trophy).

History

Although it was named in 1985, the trophy was first awarded in 1967, when the St. Louis Cardinals defeated the Boston Red Sox.

The trophy was not without precedent in Major League baseball: the Dauvray Cup (named after actress Helen Dauvray) was awarded to the winner of the World Series between the National League and the American Association from 1887 to 1890, and when a solitary major league remained, to the winner of the National League pennant, from 1891 to 1893. The Dauvray Cup was to be held by the victorious team and was to be relinquished the following year when (and if) a new champion team emerged. The Dauvray Cup mysteriously vanished following the 1893 series and has never been located. From 1894 to 1897, the Temple Cup was awarded to the winner of a postseason contest between the two top National League clubs.

A new Commissioner's Trophy is created each year, much like the Anschutz Trophy, the O'Brien Trophy and the Lombardi Trophy, and unlike the Stanley Cup, which is passed from champion to champion. Historically, the trophy was only presented in the winner's locker room, but beginning in 1997, the presentation occurred on the field if the champion clinched the title in their home stadium. Since 2017, when the Houston Astros won the World Series at Dodger Stadium, the championship presentation occurs on the field even if the champion clinches the title on the road. 

Since its inception, the only year that the Commissioner's Trophy has not been awarded was 1994, when the players' strike ended the season on August 12, resulting in the cancellation of the entire post-season. The New York Yankees have won the most Commissioner's Trophies, winning seven World Series since 1967. The St. Louis Cardinals have won four trophies, a National League record.

On October 31, 2018, during the parade celebrating the Boston Red Sox winning the World Series, the trophy was damaged by a beer can thrown by a spectator of the parade; it was subsequently repaired.

In 2020, in discussing the punishments for the Houston Astros sign stealing scandal, which did not include stripping the Astros of their 2017 championship, commissioner Rob Manfred referred to the Commissioner's Trophy as "a piece of metal." Following criticism for the dismissive nature of the remark, Manfred issued a public apology.

Design
The trophy features 30 gold-plated flags, one for each Major League team. The flags rise above a silver baseball which is covered with latitude and longitude lines, symbolizing the world, and which features 24-karat vermeil stitching. The base contains an inscription copy of the signature of the commissioner and the words "Presented by the Commissioner of Baseball".

The original 1967 trophy was designed by Balfour Jewelers of Attleboro, Massachusetts, and cost $2,500. The trophy was redesigned by Tiffany & Co. and unveiled in 2000.

By franchise
This table lists the teams that have won the Commissioner's Trophy since it was introduced in 1967. For a complete history of MLB championship teams, see List of World Series champions.

See also

Chronicle-Telegraph Cup

References

External links

World Series trophies and awards
Major League Baseball trophies and awards
Awards established in 1967
1967 establishments in the United States